The secretary of state of Wyoming is the state secretary of state of the U.S. state of Wyoming. It is a constitutional office, established under the Constitution of Wyoming and the secretary of state accedes to the governorship in case of a vacancy. The secretary of state is the keeper of the Great Seal of Wyoming and the state's official record-keeper. When the governor is traveling out-of-state, the secretary of state serves as acting governor (Wyoming has no lieutenant governor). Karen Wheeler served as acting secretary of state following the vacancy of Ed Murray, until the appointment of Edward Buchanan in March, 2018, who himself resigned September 17, 2022.

The secretary of state's office is divided into five divisions:

The Administrative Services Division keeps track of the money for the other parts of the office.  This division is also responsible for the registration of notaries public, apostilles and document authentication, and is the official registrar for all state regulations.
The Business Division files information about businesses, including charters of corporations and other business entities, and liens made pursuant to the Uniform Commercial Code.  This division also registers trademarks and trade names, and is responsible for licensing Wyoming's official trademark, the Bucking Horse and Rider.
The Compliance Division oversees the securities industry in the state, investigates violations of securities laws, and provides financial education to the public.
The Elections Division administers elections. This task includes recording voting results for statewide elections and ensuring compliance with campaign finance laws and state and federal election laws.  This division is also responsible for the registration of lobbyists.
The Technology Division maintains the secretary of state's employees' computer equipment and programs, and maintains the secretary's website.

Officeholders
Amos W. Barber became the first Wyoming secretary of state on November 8, 1890. Prior officeholders were known as Wyoming secretaries of the territory.

Wyoming secretaries of the territory

Wyoming secretaries of state

See also
 List of company registers

References